Mastino may refer to:
The rechristened name of the British boat Empire Becky

Dogs
Mastino Napoletano, one of the names for the Neapolitan Mastiff breed of dog
Software, is named after the dog
Mastinaro/Mastinari are breeders of the dogs

Personas
Bruiser Mastino, a wrestling persona performed by Mike Hallick and Glenn Jacobs
Former member of the band Punkreas

People
 (born 1949), rector for the University of Sassari
F. Mastino, midfielder for FC Baulmes
Mastino della Scala:
Mastino I della Scala (died 1277)
Mastino II della Scala (1308–1351)